Catalani is an Italian surname meaning "Catalan" or "from Catalonia". Notable people with the surname include:
Adelina Catalani (fl. 1818–1832), Franco-Italian soprano
Alfredo Catalani (1854–1893), Italian operatic composer
Angelica Catalani (1780–1849), Italian opera singer
Antonio Catalani (Romano) (–unknown), also called il Romano, Italian painter
Antonio Catalani (Siciliano) (1560–1630), also called il Siciliano, Italian painter
Giuseppe Catalani (1698-1764), Italian liturgist
Jordanus Catalani (fl. –1330), French Dominican missionary and explorer

Italian-language surnames
Italian toponymic surnames
Ethnonymic surnames